Araona or Cavina is an indigenous language spoken by the South America Araona people; about 90% of the 90 Araona people are fluent (W. Adelaar). Use of the language amongst the tribe is considered vigorous although Spanish knowledge is increasing. The Araonans live in the headwaters of the Manupari river in northwest Bolivia. Their language has a dictionary and portions of the Bible have been translated into Araona.

Capachene and Machui are dialects of either Araona or of Cavineña.

History
The Araona people and their language were long ignored in the written, European-based historical traditions, long after the Conquest of the Americas and what is now Bolivia. The first written historical mention of the Araona people and their language comes from the Franciscan missionaries Manuel Mancini and Fidel Codenach in the late 1800s, were unable to found any sort of mission in this area of the La Paz department because of the conditions on the ground. The Araona were the most populous ethnic group in the region of Colonia Nacional, and were one of the many indigenous groups who were displaced from their villages and used as slaves for the rubber industry at the end of the 19th century. Those who managed to survive and escape from servitude went on to establish themselves in various settlements in the area between the Manorimi and Monopare Rivers. In 1965, Protestant Evangelical activists and missionaries from the SIL International created a permanent settlement and cooperated with the Araona communities to establish links with other indigenous groups.

Phonology
The Araona phonemic inventory consists of four vowels, and 19 consonants.

References

External links

 Lenguas de Bolivia (online edition)
 Araona (Intercontinental Dictionary Series)

Languages of Bolivia
La Paz Department (Bolivia)
Tacanan languages